Küttner is a German surname. Notable people with the surname include:

Kurt Küttner (1907–1964), German SS officer
Joachim Kuettner (1909–2011), German-American atmospheric scientist

See also
Kuttner

German-language surnames